Pierre-Auguste Lafleur (March 3, 1872 – December 14, 1954) was a Canadian politician and a five-term Member of the Legislative Assembly of Quebec.

Background

He was born in Sainte-Adèle, Laurentides on March 3, 1872 and made career in the furniture industry. He married Jennie Veitch in Verdun, Quebec in 1918.

City Councillor

He served as a city councillor from 1921 to 1933 in Verdun.

Member of the legislature

Lafleur ran as a Conservative candidate in the provincial district of Montréal-Verdun in the 1923 election and won.  He was re-elected in the 1927, 1931 and 1935 elections.

He joined Maurice Duplessis's Union Nationale and was re-elected in the 1936 election.

He was defeated in the 1939, 1944 and 1948 elections.

Death

He died on December 14, 1954 in Verdun.

References

1872 births
1954 deaths
Conservative Party of Quebec MNAs
Union Nationale (Quebec) MNAs